Epsilon Doradus, Latinzied from ε Doradus, is a solitary star located in the southern constellation of Dorado. It is visible to the naked eye with an apparent visual magnitude of 5.11. Based upon an annual parallax shift of 5.68 mas as measured from Earth, it is located roughly 570 light years from the Sun. At that distance, the visual magnitude of the star is diminished by an extinction factor of 0.09 due to interstellar dust.

With 4.31 times the mass of the Sun and 3.8 times the Sun's radius, it is about 85% of the way through its main sequence lifetime. The star is an estimated 210 million years old and is spinning with a projected rotational velocity of 17 km/s. Epsilon Doradus radiates 556 times the solar luminosity from its photosphere at an effective temperature of 13,212 K.

References

B-type main-sequence stars
Slowly pulsating B stars

Dorado (constellation)
J05495356-6654041
Doradus, Epsilon
CD-66 0351
039844
027534
2064
IRAS catalogue objects